God Save The King is a studio album by American rapper Copywrite. It was released on Man Bites Dog Records in 2012. The title of the album derives from Sex Pistols' "God Save the Queen".

Critical reception
Slava Kuperstein of HipHopDX called the album "one of this year's strongest outings thus far." He said: "Fans of honest-to-goodness emceeing will eat this one up – Copywrite is clever and knows how to cover a gamut of topics with equal parts humor and intensity." Meanwhile, Matt Wright of XXL praised "Copywrite's ability to flow seamlessly over laid-back or up-tempo tracks, spitting multis, punchlines, and wordplay along the way."

Track listing

References

Further reading

External links
 

2012 albums
Copywrite (rapper) albums
Albums produced by Bronze Nazareth
Albums produced by Illmind
Albums produced by Khrysis
Albums produced by Marco Polo
Albums produced by RJD2